The Group (also known as The Group in Lakewood) is a Greater Cleveland theatrical company formed in 1964. Its current home for performances is the Beck Center for the Arts in Lakewood, Ohio. It is the second oldest theater company in Greater Cleveland, after the Great Lakes Theater Festival. The non-profit group produced an annual fundraiser production for local charities. The group was composed of volunteer actors and for six seasons, their own house magician.

Original productions
 1964 - Untitled
 1965 - "Tunes 'n' Times"
 1966 - "Anything Can Happen"
 1967 - "The Spring Thing"
 1968 - "A Start from Scratch"
 1969 - Untitled
 1970 - "Three Acts to Grind"
 1971 - "Three for All"
 1972 - Untitled
 1973 - "A Gypsy Takes a Bride"
 1974 - "On Your Way Violet"
 1975 - "Group Therapy"
 1976 - "Revoltin' Developments"
 1977 - "Double Play"
 1978 - "It's About Time"
 1979 - "Act Your Age"
 1980 - "Wholly Moses or Up a Crooked River"
 1981 - "Between the Covers"
 1982 - "Triple Threat"
 1983 - "Write On"
 1984 - "Black and White and Read All Over"
 1985 - "A Trivial Salute"
 1986 - "Curtain Going Up?"
 1987 - "In One Era, Out the Other"
 1988 - "A Little Travelin' Music"
 1989 - "Celebration"
 1990 - "Something"
 1991 - "Swell Hotel"
 1992 - "Group Encounters"
 1993 - "Long Ago and Far Away"
 1994 - "A Murder Runs Through It"
 1995 - "When in Rome It's Greek to Me"
 1996 - "Ghost of a Chance"
 1997 - "Never the Twain"
 1998 - "It's Too, Too Divine"
 1999 - "Dis-Oriented Express"
 2000 - "Century (All The Good Titles Were Taken)"
 2001 - "The Group Goes To The Movies"
 2002 - "A Class Act"
 2003 - "This Just In"
 2004 - "Our Show of Shows"
 2005 - "Games People Play"
 2006 - "Colonel Beauregard Tuna's Phantastical Grab Bag-o-Comedy"
 2007 - "A Pirate's Life For Me"

External links
 Official page
 History, as researched by the Lakewood Public Library

Theatre companies in Ohio
1964 establishments in Ohio
Culture of Cleveland